Vyškov Zoo is a zoo in Vyškov in the South Moravian Region of the Czech Republic.

History
The zoo was founded by Zdeněk Sokolíček and opened on 8 August 1965. After the years of the heyday came the critical phase, which culminated in 1990. There was a choice to either close down the zoo, or invest considerable funds and preserve it. It was decided to renovate the devastated garden, which served primarily as a winter habitat for animals from circuses and menageries. With the arrival of the new director Josef Kachlík steps were taken to develop the old garden into a modern zoo.

Animals
As of 2021, the zoo keeps 1197 animals in 123 species or breeds. The breeding is focused primarily at domestic and farm animals from around the world.

Gallery

References

External links

Zoos established in 1939
Vyškov
Zoos in the Czech Republic
Buildings and structures in the South Moravian Region
Tourist attractions in the South Moravian Region
1965 establishments in Czechoslovakia
Zoos established in 1965
20th-century architecture in the Czech Republic